Clizia is a comedy by Italian Renaissance political scientist and writer Niccolò Machiavelli, written in 1525. The work is based upon a classical play by Plautus.

Plot
The plot centres around a lecherous Florentine named Nicomaco who becomes attracted to an orphan girl he has raised since childhood. Nicomaco's son is also interested in the girl and wishes to marry her, but both men are manipulated by the matriarch of the family.

References

Plays by Niccolò Machiavelli
1525 plays
Comedy plays
Plays based on works by Plautus